Merhavia is a kibbutz in northern Israel. Located to the east of Afula, it falls under the jurisdiction of Jezreel Valley Regional Council.

Etymology
The name Merhavia is derived from the Book of Psalms;
Out of my distress I called on the Lord; the Lord answered me and set me in a broad place. (NRSV) In the metaphorical sense: "God set me free" - the experience of the Jews immigrating to the Land of Israel and achieving a new homeland without the straits, or distress, of persecution.

History

Bronze Age
According to the Survey of Western Palestine (SWP, 1882), it was possibly the place called Alpha in the list of Thutmes III.

Crusader-Ayyubid period
In the Crusader period it was known as la Feve or Castrum Fabe. It had a Templar castle (first mentioned in 1169/72), of which just some mounds remain. The area was under Crusader control between 1099 and 1187. 
In 1183 the Battle of Al-Fule took place here, between the Crusaders and the forces of Saladin. An aerial photograph taken in 1918 by the German air force is still showing the clear outline of La Fève castle and moat, directly adjacent to the kibbutz courtyard east of it; the castle remains have all but disappeared by now under new houses and lawns.

In 1226, Syrian geographer Yaqut al-Hamawi mentioned it as being "a town in Jund Filastin," and formerly a Crusader castle between Zir'in and Nazareth. The area was again under Crusader control between 1240/1 and 1263.

Ottoman period
According to Denys Pringle, al-Fula, the Arab village, seems to have existed until the end of the sixteenth century.

In 1799, during Napoleon's Syrian campaign, the Battle of Mount Tabor was fought around Al-Fuleh.

In 1816, James Silk Buckingham described Fooli as a village. He observed there the remains of a large building, which he presumed was "Saracen". By the water wells he found two covers for sarcophagi, one was ornamented with sculptures. There were several other settlements in sight, all populated by Muslims.

In 1838, Edward Robinson described both Al-Fuleh and the adjacent Afuleh as "deserted".

In 1859 Al-Fuleh had 64 inhabitants, and the tillage was 14 feddans, according to the English consul Rogers. William McClure Thomson, in a book published the same year, noted that both El Fuleh and the adjacent Afuleh, were "both now deserted, though both were inhabited twenty-five years ago when I first passed this way." Thomson blamed their desertion on the bedouin.

In 1875 Victor Guérin noted the remains of multicoloured mosaics by Bir Fouleh. At this time, Al-Fuleh was the home of 15 Arab families.

According to Palmer (1881), the place was earlier named in Arabic al-Fuleh ("The beans"), also rendered as El Fuleh, al-Fula etc. In 1882, the PEF's Survey of Western Palestine (SWP) described Al-Fuleh as a small adobe village, "with a few stone houses in the middle. It stands on a swell of ground, and is surrounded by corn land, and has marshy ground to the north. The water supply is from wells west of the village. Round the site are remains of the ancient Crusader fosse." The Survey noted a ruined church about 200 meters SSE of the castle, which probably was the remains of the Crusader parish church. However, these remains were destroyed in 1939-1940.

A population list from about 1887 showed that  Fuleh had about 300 inhabitants; all Muslims.

In 1910-11, Elias Sursock of Lebanon sold 10,000 dunums around the village of al-Fula, to the Jewish National Fund, part of the Sursock Purchases. The Palestinian peasants refused to leave the land and the qaimaqam (district governor) of Nazareth, Shukri al-Asali fought to overturn the sale, and refused to finalize the transaction.  The villagers themselves sent a petition to the grand vizier complaining of the oppressive use of arbitrary power (tahakkum). In particular they claimed that Ilyas Sursuk and a middleman had sold their land to people, whom they called 'Zionists' and 'sons of the religion of Moses,' (siyonist musevi) who were not Ottoman subjects, and that the sale would deprive 1,000 villagers of their livelihoods.

British Mandate: Kibbutz Merhavia
Moshav Merhavia was established in 1911, under Ottoman rule. The kibbutz was established in 1929 adjacent to the moshav, from which it took its name. The founders of the kibbutz were members of Hashomer Hatzair who had immigrated from Galicia after World War I and had been living in Haifa, including Eliezer Peri, who later represented Mapam in the Knesset.

Tourism today
The "Merhavia Grand Courtyard" is today a tourist attraction, its well-preserved original buildings bearing explanatory signs and housing - among other things - a cafe and a souvenir shop offering hand-made soap and workshops in vintage-style interiors.

Notable people

 Ran Goren (born 1942), retired fighter pilot and Major General of the IDF
 Golda Meir (1898–1978), fourth Prime Minister of the State of Israel
 Tuvya Ruebner (1924–2019), poet, editor, translator and photographer
 Hamutal Shabtai, novelist
 Yaakov Shabtai (1934–1981), novelist, playwright, and translator
 Yedidya Ya'ari (born 1947), commander of the Israeli Navy from 2000 to 2004

References

Bibliography

 
 (p. 116)
 
 

 

 

  p. 25

External links
Village website 
Survey of Western Palestine (SWP), Map 9: IAA, Wikimedia commons
Plan and photos on Mapio.net

Kibbutzim
Kibbutz Movement
Populated places established in 1929
Populated places in Northern District (Israel)
1929 establishments in Mandatory Palestine
Polish-Jewish culture in Israel